Acetaminosalol is an organic compound with the chemical formula C15H13NO4.

It is an esterification product of salicylic acid and paracetamol.  It was marketed by Bayer under the brand name Salophen as an analgesic in the late 19th and early 20th centuries.

Action and uses

In a warm alkaline solution acetaminosalol is broken up into salicylic acid and paracetamol. It is decomposed in the intestines, even when given as an injection. It was used as a substitute for salicylic acid in acute rheumatism, and as an intestinal antiseptic. It was similarly effective and much safer than salol, another intestinal antiseptic commonly used at the time. The fact that it is tasteless renders it easy to administer.

Synthesis
It is formed from the saponification of Benorilate. Patents:

Reaction of Acetaminosalol with acetic anhydride gives Benorilate.

References

Salicylate esters
Acetanilides
Analgesics
3-Hydroxypropenals
Phenol esters